is a Japanese actress and essayist. She graduated from Hosei University.

External links

Profile at JMDb 

Japanese actresses
1957 births
Living people
People from Nagaoka, Niigata
Hosei University alumni
Japanese women essayists